Dominik Ferenčič (born 29 May 1996) is a Slovak footballer who currently plays for FC Rohožník as a forward.

Club career

Spartak Myjava
Ferenčič made his professional Fortuna Liga's debut for Spartak Myjava on 30 May 2015 against MFK Košice.

References

External links
 Spartak Myjava profile
 
 Futbalnet profile

1996 births
Living people
Slovak footballers
Association football forwards
Spartak Myjava players
Slovak Super Liga players